Imazapyr is a non-selective herbicide used for the control of a broad range of weeds including terrestrial annual and perennial grasses and broadleaved herbs, woody species, and riparian and emergent aquatic species.  It is used to eliminate Lithocarpus densiflorus (Tan Oak) and Arbutus menziesii (Pacific Madrone). Additionally, imazapyr is used to control annual and perennial grass and broadleaved weeds, brush, vines and many deciduous trees. Imazapyr is absorbed by the leaves and roots, and moves rapidly through the plant. It accumulates in the meristem region (active growth region) of the plant. In plants, imazapyr disrupts protein synthesis and interferes with cell growth and DNA synthesis.

Imazapyr is an ingredient of the commercial product Ortho GroundClear. A related herbicide, imazapic is an ingredient in Roundup Extended Control.  Both chemicals are non-selective, long-lasting, and effective in weed control.   They are, however, water-soluble, and depending on soil type and moisture they can move into parts of the landscape where they were not sprayed.  Some desirable landscape plants are especially sensitive to them and can be damaged.

References

Carboxylic acids
Herbicides
Pyridines
Imidazolines
Isopropyl compounds